Portland Airport may refer to:

 Portland Airport (Victoria) in Portland, Victoria, Australia (IATA: PTJ)
 Portland International Airport in Portland, Oregon, United States (FAA: PDX)
 Portland International Jetport in Portland, Maine, United States (FAA: PWM)
 Portland Municipal Airport (Indiana) in Portland, Indiana, United States (FAA: PLD)
 Portland Municipal Airport (Tennessee) in Portland, Tennessee, United States (FAA: 1M5)

See also
 Portland-Hillsboro Airport in Hillsboro, Oregon, United States (FAA: HIO)
 Portland-Troutdale Airport in Troutdale, Oregon, United States (FAA: TTD)
 Portland-Mulino Airport in Mulino, Oregon, United States (FAA: 4S9)
 Portland Downtown Heliport in Portland, Oregon, United States (FAA: 61J)
 Hunt Airport in Portland, Texas, United States (FAA: 9R5)